Hexoplon longispina is a species of beetle in the family Cerambycidae. It was described by Per Olof Christopher Aurivillius in 1899.

References

Hexoplonini
Beetles described in 1899